The Central Committee (CC) composition was elected by the 6th Congress, and sat from 3 August 1917 until 8 March 1918. The CC 1st Plenary Session established the Narrow Composition (abolished October 1917), the Politburo (abolished November 1917) and the Bureau (established in November 1917), while sanctioning the establishment of the Secretariat on the orders of the Narrow Composition.

Plenary sessions

Composition

Members

Candidates

Prospectives

References

General

Plenary sessions, apparatus heads, ethnicity (by clicking on the individual names on "The Central Committee elected by the VIth Party Congress (b) 3 (16) .8.1917 members" reference), the Central Committee full- and candidate membership, Bureau membership, Secretariat membership and Orgburo membership were taken from these sources:

Bibliography

Sources

Central Committee of the Communist Party of the Soviet Union
Russian Social Democratic Labour Party members
1917 establishments in Russia
1918 disestablishments in Russia